Housatonic Council is a regional organization of the Boy Scouts of America covering several towns adjoining the Housatonic River in South-Central Connecticut. The council originated from the Derby Council, voting to organize as a first class council at its annual meeting on January 25, 1923. The council had jurisdiction over Scouting in Ansonia, Shelton and Seymour in addition to Derby, with the town of Oxford incorporated into the council at a later date. It has been headquartered in Derby, Connecticut since its founding.

The Housatonic Council owns and operates Edmund D. Strang Scout Reservation in Goshen, Connecticut. Paugassett Lodge, of the Order of the Arrow, serves this council.

Organization
Housatonic Council's geographic area includes the following Lower Naugatuck Valley towns of Derby, Ansonia, Seymour, Shelton and Oxford.

History
Housatonic Council is notable for being one of the smallest in the Boy Scouts of America. Despite several waves of council mergers instituted nationwide in the modern era, Housatonic Council's current composition is only one town larger than it was when it elevated to a full council in 1923. It is not uncommon for modern BSA councils to cover as many counties as Housatonic Council has towns.

Camps

Edmund D. Strang Scout Reservation
Edmund D. Strang Scout Reservation (ESSR), formally called Housatonic Scout Reservation (HSR), is located in Goshen, Connecticut. It is the only existing camp owned by Housatonic Council. ESSR is a smaller Boy Scout Camp with only . The camp is the home of the Paugassett Lodge. ESSR holds summer and winter Camp programs. Also, the camp is often used for a Fall and Spring Camp-o-ree. During the off-season, the camp is also available for use by outside organizations and Scout Troops, Crews and Packs. The camp is available for use by Housatonic Council and non-Housatonic Council units.

The summer program includes four weeks of Boy Scout Resident Camping and one week of Webelos Resident Camping. Boy Scout Resident Camp focuses on Merit Badge advancement. One week of the Boy Scout Resident Camp includes a Venturing program. It comprises a number of trips off-site for a more exciting approach to Scouting. Also, another week includes an Adventure to Eagle Program, where a unit composed of Scouts registered with the A2E program work on Eagle-Required Merit Badges and learn the steps along the Trail to Eagle. Webelos Resident Camp focuses on advancement in the form of Activity Pins.

During all four weeks of Boy Scout Resident Camp, a variety of Program Areas are in operation. These Program Areas are Brownsea Island, Field Sports/Shooting Sports, Waterfront, Outdoor Skills, S.T.E.M.,Ecology/Conservation, Health Lodge, Climbing Tower and Handicrafts. The "Brownsea Island Program," formerly known as "First Class Emphasis," focuses on the fundamental skills of Scouting, such as the Patrol Method, First Aid, Hiking, Camping, Fire-Building and Knot-Tying. The Field Sports/Shooting Sports program includes Rifle, Shotgun, Archery and Personal Fitness. Also for troop activities, this Program Area sponsors various Field Sports. As part of an Older Boy Program, the area sponsors Black-Powder Shooting and Action Archery. The Waterfront Area includes Rowing, Swimming, Lifesaving, Small-boat Sailing, Kayaking and Canoeing. Also, early in the morning, the ever popular Polar Bear Swim occurs, where a large group of "Lunatics" jumps in the water for a period of singing and fun. There are also designated Free-Swim periods, where anyone may come to the area to swim or boat. Waterfront also offers advancement opportunities with Snorkeling, BSA, Kayaking, BSA, the Mile Swim and BSA Lifeguard. The Outdoor Skills area, formerly known as "Scoutcraft," teaches subjects including Cooking, Pioneering, Wilderness Survival, Camping and Orienteering. Also, Backpacking, Hiking, Totin' Chip, Firm'n Chit and the Paul Bunyan Award are taught by Appointment. Ecology/Conservation, often referred to as "Econ," teaches a large amount of merit badges including Astronomy, Bird Study, Environmental Science, Fish and Wildlife Management, Forestry, Mammal Study, Nature, Soil and Water Conservation and Weather. Insect Study as well as Reptile and Amphibian Study are offered by appointment. The Health Lodge currently offers First Aid. Handicrafts teaches Basketry, Computers, Home Repair, Indian Lore, Leatherwork, Metalwork and Woodcarving. Art is also available by appointment.

Camp Irving
Camp Irving was located in Shelton, Connecticut in the Birchbank area along the Housatonic River. The camp was closed in 1945 and the buildings were razed in 1948.

Paugassett Lodge
Paugassett Lodge is the Order of the Arrow lodge for the Housatonic Council. Their Algonquian name is translated as "Muddy Pond". Their lodge totem in an Iroquois dance mask. The lodge was founded in 1961 and is still in existence. In 2000, the lodge was the recipient of the E. Urner Goodman Award for their effectiveness in promoting and increasing Scout camping in their council.

References

See also
Scouting in Connecticut

Local councils of the Boy Scouts of America
Northeast Region (Boy Scouts of America)
1923 establishments in Connecticut